Colorado v. Connelly, 479 U.S. 157 (1986), was a U.S. Supreme Court case that was initiated by Francis Connelly, who insisted that his schizophrenic episode rendered him incompetent, nullifying his waiver of his Miranda rights.

Prior history 
Francis Connelly approached a Denver police officer and expressed interest in talking about a murder that he committed. After being read his rights, Connelly continued to want to confess to the murder, so a detective was called. The detective repeated Connelly's rights again, but Connelly remained willing to discuss the murder. Connelly then waived his right to counsel, and described the details of the murder.

Soon afterwards, the court determined that Connelly was not of sound enough mind to stand trial, and was given six months of therapy. After the six months was completed, Connelly stood trial. During the trial, the psychiatrist that evaluated Connelly testified that he believed that God told him to confess to the murder, or commit suicide. The lower court ruled that Connelly's waiver of his Miranda rights was made when he was incompetent due to his mental illness, so the confession of Connelly was not permitted in court.

The case then went to the Colorado Supreme Court, where the local court's decision was upheld. The evidence of Connelly's confession was suppressed under the due process clause of the Fourteenth Amendment to the United States Constitution.

Case 
The Supreme Court heard the case, and decided that Connelly's confession should not have been suppressed, due to a specific sentence in Miranda v. Arizona that stated that confessions may only be thrown out if the accused is coercively interrogated by the government. The Supreme Court reversed the Colorado Supreme Court's decision to suppress the evidence, stating that there was no violation of the due process clause. In the words of the Supreme Court:

Consequences 

Connelly significantly changed the voluntariness standard - the test used to determine the admissibility of confessions under the due process clauses of the Fifth and Fourteenth Amendments. Before Connelly the test was whether the confession was voluntary considering the totality of the circumstances. "Voluntary" carried its everyday meaning: the confession had to be a product of the exercise of the defendant's free will rather than police coercion. After Connelly the totality of circumstances test is not even triggered unless the defendant can show coercive police conduct. Questions of free will and rational decision making are irrelevant to a due process claim unless police misconduct existed and a causal connection can be shown between the misconduct and the confession.

See also
 List of United States Supreme Court cases, volume 479
 List of United States Supreme Court cases
 Lists of United States Supreme Court cases by volume
 List of United States Supreme Court cases by the Rehnquist Court
Exclusionary rule

References

Further reading

External links
 

United States Supreme Court cases
United States Supreme Court cases of the Rehnquist Court
Miranda warning case law
Insanity-related case law
1986 in United States case law
1986 in Colorado
Legal history of Colorado
Schizophrenia
History of Denver